Duke of Soma is a hereditary title in the Peerage of Spain, accompanied by the dignity of Grandee and granted in 1502 by Ferdinand II to Ramón Folch de Cardona, 11th Baron of Bellpuig and 1st Count of Oliveto, for his services as viceroy of Sicily.

The name makes reference to the town of Somma Vesuviana, in Naples, Italy.

Dukes of Soma (1502)

Ramón Folch de Cardona y Requesens, 1st Duke of Soma
Fernando Folch de Cardona y Requesens, 2nd Duke of Soma
Luis Folch de Cardona y Fernández de Córdoba, 3rd Duke of Soma
Antonio Folch de Cardona y Fernández de Córdoba, 4th Duke of Soma
Luis Fernández de Córdoba y Aragón, 5th Duke of Soma
Antonio Fernández de Córdoba y de Rojas, 6th Duke of Soma
Francisco Fernández de Córdoba y de Rojas, 7th Duke of Soma
Félix María Fernández de Córdoba y Fernández de Córdoba, 8th Duke of Soma
Francisco Javier Fernández de Córdoba y Fernández de Córdoba, 9th Duke of Soma
Buenaventura Francisca Fernández de Córdoba y Fernández de Córdoba, 10th Duchess of Soma
Ventura Osorio de Moscoso y Fernández de Córdoba, 11th Duke of Soma
Vicente Joaquín Osorio de Moscoso y Guzmán, 12th Duke of Soma
Vicente Isabel Osorio de Moscoso y Álvarez de Toledo, 13th Duke of Soma
Vicente Pío Osorio de Moscoso y Ponce de León, 14th Duke of Soma
Alfonso Osorio de Moscoso y Osorio de Moscoso, 15th Duke of Soma
María Eulalia Osorio de Moscoso y López de Ansó, 16th Duchess of Soma
José María Ruiz de Bucesta y Osorio de Moscoso, 17th Duke of Soma
Jaime Ruiz de Bucesta y de Mora, 18th Duke of Soma

See also
List of dukes in the peerage of Spain
List of current Grandees of Spain

References 

Dukedoms of Spain
Grandees of Spain
Lists of dukes
Lists of Spanish nobility